Space Explorers: The ISS Experience is a Canadian virtual reality series directed by Félix Lajeunesse and Paul Raphaël, and produced in association with Time Studios.

Premise 
The series follows eight astronauts on their life changing missions aboard the International Space Station.

Episodes

Awards and nominations

References

External links
 

2020 Canadian television series debuts
2020s Canadian documentary television series
Canadian Screen Award-winning television shows